The National Party (PN), also known as the White Party, is a major political party in Uruguay. It was founded in 1836 by Manuel Oribe, making it the country's oldest active political party, and together with the Colorado Party, its origin dates back to the time of the creation of the Uruguayan State.

Positioned on the centre-right of the political spectrum, the National Party is ideologically liberal, nationalist, Pan-Americanist and humanist. Considering the interim co-government of the Gobierno del Cerrito headed by Manuel Oribe, and the Defense Government from Montevideo led by the Colorado Joaquín Suarez, in the middle of the Uruguayan Civil War, and with the exception of the current administration of Luis Lacalle Pou, the PN has ruled the country for 35 years interruptedly throughout its history; This includes constitutional, interim, de facto presidents, and collegiate governments. Although General Manuel Oribe is recognized as its founder, Aparicio Saravia is considered its idealist.

The National Party is a defender of decentralization, and its demographic base skews toward people living in rural areas.

History 

The identity of the National Party dates back to August 10, 1836 when the then president Manuel Oribe decreed the use of the white banner with the inscription "Defenders of the Laws", in the battle of Carpintería, Oribe faced the revolutionary army of Fructuoso Rivera and colored badges were used to distinguish between the parties. For this reason, the National Party is also known as the "White Party."

On July 7, 1872, the first Program of Principles was approved, in which respect for freedoms, the maintenance of peace as the supreme good for the Nation, the representation of minorities, the decentralization of the country, the strengthening of justice, and the promotio of education and instruction.

In March 2020, National Party’s Luis Lacalle Pou was sworn as the new President of Uruguay, meaning Uruguay got the first conservative government after 15 years of left-wing leadership under the Broad Front coalition.

Electoral history

Presidential elections

Note 
Under the electoral system in place at the time called Ley de Lemas system, each political party could have as many as three presidential candidates. The combined result of the votes for a party's candidates determined which party would control the executive branch, and whichever of the winning party's candidates finished in first place would be declared President this system was used form the 1942 election until the 1994 election until in 1996, a referendum amended the constitution to restrict each party to a single presidential candidate, effective from the 1999 elections.

Parliamentary elections

National Council of Administration and National Council of Government elections

Note 
The National Council of Administration ruling alongside the President of the Republic between 1918 and 1933 and it was re-established as National Council of Government was the ruling body in Uruguay between 1952 and 1967

2004 elections 
At the 2004 national elections, the National Party won 36 seats out of 99 in the Chamber of Deputies and 11 seats out of 31 in the Senate. Its presidential candidate, Jorge Larrañaga, obtained the same day 35.1% of the valid, popular vote.

2009 elections 
At the 2009 national elections, the National Party won 31 seats out of 99 in the Chamber of Deputies and 9 seats out of 31 in the Senate. Its presidential candidate, Luis Alberto Lacalle, obtained on 25 October 29.07% of the valid, popular vote.

2014 elections 
At the 2014 elections, its presidential candidate was Luis Lacalle Pou.

2019 elections 
In 2019, the National Party returns to lead the government after thirty years, when Luis Lacalle Pou defeated leftist Daniel Martínez in the second round, with the nationalist as leader of the so-called Coalición Multicolor (Multicolor Alliance). This will be the second occasion since the return of democracy and the first of the 21st century when the Party reaches the government.

Sectors and factions

National Alliance
The leader of National Alliance was Jorge Larrañaga, until 2021, who ran for President of Uruguay in 2004. He was beaten by Tabaré Vázquez of the Broad Front. The new leader is still undefined until the next internal elections of the sector. The ideologies of the sector are centrism and christian democracy.

Herrerismo
Herrerism is built on a foundation of economic liberalism and liberal conservatism, although earlier in its history it took on more anti-imperialist and traditionalist policies.

Wilsonist Current
The Wilsonist Current is a social-liberal faction of the National Party of Uruguay. Founded in 2002 by Francisco Gallinal, its name comes from the Wilsonism, an important tendency of the Party, led by Wilson Ferreira Aldunate.

See also 
 Ideas and legacy of Luis Alberto de Herrera
 Museum of the house of Luis Alberto de Herrera

References

External links 
 

 
Political parties established in 1836
1836 establishments in Uruguay
Christian democratic parties in South America